Bjørn Heyn (18 November 1928 – 28 March 2015) was a Norwegian weightlifter. He competed in the men's lightweight event at the 1952 Summer Olympics.

References

External links
 

1928 births
2015 deaths
Norwegian male weightlifters
Olympic weightlifters of Norway
Weightlifters at the 1952 Summer Olympics
People from Larvik
Sportspeople from Vestfold og Telemark
20th-century Norwegian people